, or the , is a major metropolitan area in Japan that is centered on the city of Nagoya (the "Chūkyō", i.e., the "capital in the middle") in Aichi Prefecture. The area makes up the most urbanized part of the Tōkai region. The population of 10,110,000 over an area of 7,072 square kilometers.
Nevertheless, like most of Japan's major metro areas, the core of it lies on a fertile alluvial plain, in this case the Nōbi Plain.

It is among the 50 most populous metropolitan areas in the world, and is the third most populous metropolitan area in Japan (after Greater Tokyo and Osaka-Kobe-Kyoto), containing roughly 7% of Japan's population.  Historically, this region has taken a back seat to the other two power centers, both politically and economically; however, the agglomeration of Nagoya is the world's 22nd-largest metro area economy, in terms of gross metropolitan product at purchasing power parity in 2014, according to a study by the Brookings Institution. The GDP of Greater Nagoya, Nagoya Metropolitan Employment Area, is US$256.3 billion in 2010.

Municipalities 
The metropolitan area stretches beyond the central city of Nagoya to other municipalities in Aichi Prefecture, as well as neighboring Gifu and Mie prefectures.

Aichi Prefecture 

Western Aichi Prefecture（Owari Province）

 Aisai
 Ama
 Chita
 Handa
 Ichinomiya
 Inazawa
 Inuyama
 Iwakura
 Kasugai
 Komaki
 Kitanagoya
 Kiyosu
 Kōnan
 Nagakute
 Nisshin
 Ōbu
 Owariasahi
 Seto
 Tōkai
 Tokoname
 Toyoake
 Tsushima
 Yatomi

Eastern Aichi Prefecture（Mikawa Province）

 Anjō
 Chiryū
 Gamagori
 Hekinan
 Kariya
 Miyoshi
 Nishio
 Okazaki
 Tahara
 Takahama
 Toyohashi
 Toyokawa
 Toyota

Gifu Prefecture 

 Ena
 Gifu
 Hashima
 Kaizu
 Kakamigahara
 Kani
 Minokamo
 Mizuho
 Mizunami
 Motosu
 Nakatsugawa
 Ōgaki
 Tajimi
 Toki

Mie Prefecture 

 Inabe
 Kuwana
 Suzuka
 Yokkaichi

Transport

Major airports 
 Chūbu Centrair International Airport
 Nagoya Airport

Major railways 
There are at least 38 passenger train lines in the Greater Nagoya area.  JR runs six, Nagoya Subway seven, Meitetsu 18, Kintetsu four, and five other operators one each.
JR Central

Chūō Main Line
Taita Line
Kansai Main Line
Takayama Main Line
Tōkaidō Main Line
Tōkaidō Shinkansen

Other operators

Aichi Loop Line
Aonami Line
Ise Railway
Jōhoku Line
Kintetsu
Linimo
Meitetsu
Toyotetsu
Nagoya Subway
Yokkaichi Asunarou Railway

Major intercity highways 
 Chita-Hanto Expressway
 Chūō Expressway
 Higashi-Meihan Expressway
 Isewangan Expressway
 Meishin Expressway
 Tōkai Ring Expressway
 Tōkai-Hokuriku Expressway
 Tomei Expressway

GDP
2014 Chūkyō metropolitan area's GDP per capita (PPP) was US$40,144.

Demographics 

See also 
 Nagoya
 Greater Nagoya Initiative
 Chūkyō Industrial Area
 Chūkyō Television Broadcasting
 Chukyo University
 List of metropolitan areas in Japan by population

Notes 

The area defined by the Chukyo Area Person-Trip Survey, a study of commuter movement, is slightly different from the census definition. It includes southern Aichi and areas immediately north of Gifu City. It adds two cities in Aichi Prefecture (Tahara and Toyohashi) and two cities in Gifu Prefecture (Mino and Seki). Additionally, it excludes two cities in Gifu Prefecture (Ena and Nakatsugawa).

Metropolitan areas of Japan
Chūbu region